Kris Barlow (born 15 July 1973) is a former Australian rules footballer who played with Hawthorn in the Australian Football League (AFL).

AFL career
Drafted at the age of 25 from Vermont, picked up at 86 in the 1998 National Draft, Barlow was a versatile forward who had great marking ability.

Hampered by wrist injuries, he endured a slow start to his AFL career. A five-goal haul against Collingwood in 2001 showcased the ability Barlow had.

A knee injury in practice match in Morwell at the start of 2004 restricted him to seven matches and he just made it to the 100 game milestone. Barlow was delisted at the end of 2004.

Statistics
 Statistics are correct to the end of 2019

|- style="background-color: #EAEAEA"
! scope="row" style="text-align:center" | 1999
|
| 33 || 15 || 9 || 5 || 175 || 61 || 236 || 52 || 16 || 0.6 || 0.3 || 11.7 || 4.1 || 15.7 || 3.5 || 1.1
|-
! scope="row" style="text-align:center" | 2000
|
| 33 || 21 || 11 || 6 || 221 || 73 || 294 || 102 || 37 || 0.5 || 0.3 || 10.5 || 3.5 || 14.0 || 5.0 || 1.7
|- style="background-color: #EAEAEA"
! scope="row" style="text-align:center" | 2001
|
| 33 || 19 || 23 || 12 || 204 || 80 || 284 || 94 || 38 || 1.2 || 0.6 || 10.7 || 4.2 || 14.9 || 5.0 || 2.0
|-
! scope="row" style="text-align:center" | 2002
|
| 33 || 20 || 21 || 13 || 187 || 60 || 247 || 100 || 32 || 1.5 || 0.7 || 9.4 || 3.0 || 12.4 || 5.0 || 1.6
|- style="background-color: #EAEAEA"
! scope="row" style="text-align:center" | 2003
|
| 33 || 20 || 9 || 7 || 205|| 106 || 311 || 119 || 41 || 0.4 || 0.1 || 10.2 || 5.3 || 15.5 || 6.0 || 2.0
|-
! scope="row" style="text-align:center" | 2004
|
| 33 || 7 || 1 || 1 || 48 || 26 || 74 || 25 || 13 || 0.1 || 0.1 || 6.9 || 3.7 || 10.6 || 3.6 || 1.9
|-
|- class="sortbottom"
! colspan=3| Career
! 102 !! 74 !! 44 !! 1040 !! 406 !! 1446 !! 495 !! 177 !! 0.73 !! 0.43 !! 10.20 !! 3.98 !! 14.18 !! 4.85 !! 1.74
|}

External links

Profile at Hawksheadquarters

References

1973 births
Living people
Australian rules footballers from Victoria (Australia)
Hawthorn Football Club players
Box Hill Football Club players